Sérgio Pereira da Silva Porto (Niteroi, 19 January 1926 – Novosibirsk conference, 21 June 1979) was a Brazilian physicist.

Bibliography
 Influence of Optical Activity on Raman spectre
 Experimental observation of Polaritons in Ionic Crystals
 Study of Oblique Phonons in Birefringent Crystals
 Light Scattering by Spin Waves (Magnons)
 Raman Scattering by F-Centers
 Enhancement of Raman Cross-sections due to Resonant Absorption
 Observation of Anti-symmetric Electronic Raman Scattering
 Raman Scattering from Metallic Surfaces
 Depolarization Ratio and Raman Cross-section of Gases
 Symmetry forbidden First-order Raman Spectra in Disordered Solids
 Laser Isotope Separation
 Generalization of Lyddane-Sachs-Teller relation for Ordered-Disordered Crystals
 Absence of Soft-mode in Ordered-Disordered Ferroelectrics.

References

External links
 SÉRGIO PEREIRA DA SILVA PORTO
 Catálogo Sérgio Porto
 About Sergio Porto
 

1926 births
1979 deaths
Brazilian physicists